John Michael Tobin (1835 or 1841–1898) was an officer in the Union Army who received the Medal of Honor for his actions at the Battle of Malvern Hill during the American Civil War.

Biography
John Tobin was born in County Kilkenny, Ireland in 1835 or 1841. He was commissioned as an officer of the 9th Massachusetts Infantry from Boston Massachusetts in June 1861. He served as regimental adjutant from January to August 1862, and mustered out with his regiment as a Captain in June 1864. Tobin received the Medal of Honor for his actions on July 1, 1862 at the Battle of Malvern Hill during the Peninsula Campaign. 

Tobin is buried at Mount Auburn Cemetery in Cambridge, Massachusetts.

Medal of Honor citation
Rank and organization: First Lieutenant and Adjutant, 9th Massachusetts Infantry. Place and date: At Malvern Hill, Va., July 1, 1862. Entered service at: Boston, Mass. Birth: Ireland. Date of issue: March 11, 1896.

Citation:

Voluntarily took command of the 9th Massachusetts while adjutant, bravely fighting from 3 p.m. until dusk, rallying and re_forming the regiment under fire; twice picked up the regimental flag, the color bearer having been shot down, and placed it in worthy hands.

See also

 1868 Massachusetts legislature
 List of Medal of Honor recipients
 List of American Civil War Medal of Honor recipients: T–Z

Notes

References
 

1841 births
1898 deaths
Union Army soldiers
United States Army Medal of Honor recipients
Irish-born Medal of Honor recipients
Irish soldiers in the United States Army
American Civil War recipients of the Medal of Honor
People from County Kilkenny